Susan Carol Maciorowski (née Nichols; June 10, 1965 – September 1, 2020) was an American artist best known for her work with Walt Disney Animation Studios predominantly during the Disney Renaissance and Post-Renaissance.

Early life and education
She was born to parents Brian and Julie. She graduated from East Longmeadow High School in 1983 before going on to study visual animation at the California Institute of the Arts where she later lectured, graduating in 1987.

Personal life
She married Chester “JR” Maciorowski and had two children, Stephanie and Jonathan.

Death
In 2015, she was diagnosed with breast cancer. She received treatment at D'Amour Center for Cancer Care in Springfield, Massachusetts.

Disney released a statement announcing her death in September 2020 with a long thread celebrating her work. Eric Goldberg said “She will be sadly missed by those of us who had the good fortune to work with her, but her influence on those films will be there forever.”

Filmography

Film

Television

Awards and nominations

References

External links

1965 births
2020 deaths
20th-century American artists
21st-century American artists
20th-century American women artists
21st-century American women artists
American production designers
Artists from Massachusetts
California Institute of the Arts alumni
California Institute of the Arts faculty
People from East Longmeadow, Massachusetts
Walt Disney Animation Studios people
Women production designers
Deaths from breast cancer
Deaths from cancer in Massachusetts